In geometry, a hexecontahedron (or hexacontahedron) is a polyhedron with 60 faces. There are many symmetric forms, and the ones with highest symmetry have icosahedral symmetry:

Four Catalan solids, convex:
 Pentakis dodecahedron -  isosceles triangles
 Deltoidal hexecontahedron - kites
 Pentagonal hexecontahedron - pentagons
 Triakis icosahedron - isosceles triangles

Concave
 Rhombic hexecontahedron - rhombi

27 uniform star-polyhedral duals: (self-intersecting)
Small dodecicosacron, Great dodecicosacron
Small rhombidodecacron, Great rhombidodecacron
Small dodecacronic hexecontahedron, Great dodecacronic hexecontahedron
Rhombicosacron
Small icosacronic hexecontahedron, Medial icosacronic hexecontahedron, Great icosacronic hexecontahedron
Small stellapentakis dodecahedron, Great stellapentakis dodecahedron
Great pentakis dodecahedron
Great triakis icosahedron
Small ditrigonal dodecacronic hexecontahedron, Great ditrigonal dodecacronic hexecontahedron
Medial deltoidal hexecontahedron, Great deltoidal hexecontahedron
Medial pentagonal hexecontahedron, Great pentagonal hexecontahedron
Medial inverted pentagonal hexecontahedron, Great inverted pentagonal hexecontahedron
Great pentagrammic hexecontahedron
Small hexagonal hexecontahedron, Medial hexagonal hexecontahedron, Great hexagonal hexecontahedron
Small hexagrammic hexecontahedron

References 

Polyhedra